The Spanish toothcarp (Aphanius iberus), also known as the Spanish pupfish or Iberian killifish, is a small, endemic species of fish in the family Cyprinodontidae. Its risk of extinction is one of the greatest of any Iberian vertebrate. Its limited range, coupled with the drastic population decline the species has suffered in the last two decades, has caused it to be placed on endangered species lists, both in Spain and internationally.  In addition, habitat fragmentation, likely due to humans, has resulted in this species becoming increasingly stagnant and has led to increased genetic drift. Also found to be contributing to their endangerment was genetic diversity of mitochondrial DNA. The mitochondrial DNA coupled with A. iberus’s geographic distribution has been able to affect their population genetic structure gradually in different spaces. Its conservation status in the south of the Iberian peninsula has notably worsened.

A similar fish in the peninsula's south-west has been classified as an independent species, Aphanius baeticus. Aphanius saourensis is another similar species in Algeria.

Description

Morphology
Females are longer than males of the same age. It has an oblong body and rounded fins. Its  dorsal fin is underdeveloped with respect to the fish's girth. It has large scales, numbering 20 to 26 across the body at its widest point.

It has obvious sexual dimorphism. The males are marked with bluish to silver-colored vertical stripes on the flanks and dark bands on the caudal fin. The females are generally greenish-brown with dark blotches distributed irregularly over their bodies; their fins are transparent and mostly unpatterned. Some populations, most notably those in Murcia, have short, dark stripes as opposed to blotches.

Reproduction
The lifespan of a Spanish toothcarp is short. They reach sexual maturity at age three months. The females spawn repeatedly each season, producing from 100 to 900 eggs. Toothcarps in the Murcia region tend to spawn between April and August, while more northerly populations, such as those in the Delta del Ebro, lay their eggs between May and August. Spawning is usually done in areas with nearby vegetation, which shelters the eggs.

Hatchlings emerge approximately eight days after the eggs are laid. Females that hatch in April are able to reproduce in June.

While the females spawn, adult males set up small territories that they defend from other males in ritualized combats through which they court the females.

Behavior
The Spanish toothcarp is an omnivore, and eats insects, crustaceans, worms and algae. Generally, toothcarps travel in small groups, staying near underwater vegetation, where they normally go unnoticed.

The biology of the Spanish toothcarp is characterized by a high growth rate, early maturity, a high reproductive rate, multiple periods of egg-laying and a short lifespan. From an evolutionary ecology point of view, this lifestyle is highly adaptive for fish that live in unstable environments, such as estuaries, where unpredictable conditions increase mortality. This strategy allows the toothcarp to exploit environmentally favorable conditions during the short intervals in which they occur, thereby revitalizing the population.

Habitat
Spanish toothcarp inhabit shallow, slow-moving bodies of water such as river-mouths, coastal lakes, and ponds. They occur in saline and fresh water alike, due to their ability to tolerate high levels of salinity: they are euryhaline.

Despite their adaptability, they have been displaced by invasive species, such as both species of mosquitofish, introduced from North America to Spain in 1921 by doctor Sadí de Buen Lozano in an attempt to control malarial mosquitoes. The toothcarp has retreated to high salinity areas where the mosquitofish cannot live.

Distribution
The Spanish toothcarp is characteristic of the Iberian peninsula, and extends from the Aigüamolls of Alt Empordà to Lake Adra in Almería. In the last two decades, the Spanish toothcarp has suffered a severe decline, due in part to destruction of suitable habitats. Only a few dozen isolated populations are known.

They have been found in the alluvial plain of the Segura River, the Chicamo River in Abanilla, the wetlands surrounding the Mar Menor and Valencian Community (more specifically in the Parque Natural de El Hondo, and in the Parque Natural de la Albufera with its springs), the Parque Natural del Delta del Ebro in Tarragona, and the Albufera de Adra and the Adra River.

Divergence between populations
Phylogenetic relationships and genetic divergence have been observed in Iberian populations of Aphanius iberus by using isozymes along with the complete genetic sequence of chromosome B. The results for nuclear genes were consistent with those for mitochondria, and demonstrated that the Atlantic and Mediterranean toothcarp populations derive from separate lineages. The level of genetic divergence shows that they were isolated early and that gene flow has not occurred. The divergence between these two monophyletic clades is the same as that found between other species of pupfish. This discovery makes it necessary to separate the Atlantic and Mediterranean populations in order to protect their diversity and genetic identities.

Molecular analysis, together with morphometric data, has taxonomic implications. In fact, the populations of the Atlantic basin are so different from those in Europe that they have been recognized as a separate species, Aphanius baeticus. The species name Aphanius iberus is limited to populations that live in the Mediterranean.

Conservation status
Despite being distributed over a large area on the peninsula, the Spanish toothcarp is largely found in small, threatened areas. Because of this, the Spanish Ministero de Medio Ambiente lists it as an endangered species.

Among the threats are:
 Water contamination by agricultural and urban waste
 Habitat destruction, primarily from development
 Introduced species such as Louisiana crawfish, mosquitofish and largemouth bass
 Disappearance of channels and irrigation ponds
 Stream bed contamination by accidental spills
 Unintended consequences of combating eutrophication from algae, using toxic chemicals such as copper sulfate, or by covering them to prevent sunlight from reaching the water
 Eutrophication from algae
 Contamination of albuferas
 Keeping them as pets once increased their decline, as they were highly valued by aquarists. This interest has recently shifted to more colorful tropical fish.

Vernacular names
This fish is known as fartet or peixet de sequiol in Spanish and Catalan (the latter sometimes uses the diminutive fartonet).

See also
Samaruc

References

External links

Cyprinodontidae
Endemic fish of the Iberian Peninsula
Fish described in 1846
Aphanius
Taxobox binomials not recognized by IUCN